Karl von Mansfeld (1543 – 24 August 1595) was a German general during the Cologne War and the Ottoman-Habsburg wars.

Von Mansfeld was the son of Count Peter Ernst I von Mansfeld-Vorderort, born in present-day Luxembourg, and was educated in France. He entered the military of Philip II of Spain, and was appointed a general and an admiral in the navy of the Spanish Netherlands. He was sent to Hungary, where along with Count Mátyás Cseszneky he participated in the siege of Esztergom in 1595 during the Long War. He died shortly thereafter, probably of his wounds, in Komárom.

Family

He married twice, first to Diane de Cossé and, second, to Marie Christine von Egmond, who died 1622.

She had, from her second marriage, a son, Alexandre de Bournonville Duc de Bournonville, Comte de Henin-Lietard (14 September 1585, Brussels, died 21 March 1656), and, probably with Mansfeld, a second son, Antoine III de Lalaing (born between 1588 and 1590 and died 26 September 1613), Count of Hoogstraeten,  who married Maria Margaretha de Berlaymont, daughter of Claude Berlaymont, also known as Haultpenne.

Siblings
From his father's first marriage on 1.4.1542 to Margaretha van Brederode (*ca 1520, died 31 May 1554);

 Friedrich, *1542, died 1559
 Polyxene, +after 17 September 1591; m.  Palamedes von Nassau-Chalon (+1600)

Step Siblings:

From his father's second marriage 22.2.1562 Marie de Montmorency (+5.2.1570) 
 Philipp Oktavian, *1564, +1591
 Dorothea; m. Franz Verdugo

Natural Sibling [by Anna von Benzerath] 
 Peter Ernst II von Mansfeld *1580,  near Sarajevo 29.11.1626

References

 

1543 births
1595 deaths
German generals
Spanish generals
Karl
People of the Long Turkish War
Generals of the Holy Roman Empire